The Diocese of Ozieri is a Roman Catholic bishopric in Sardinia, Italy. It is a suffragan of the Metropolitan Archdiocese of Sassari.

History 
The historical Diocese of Bisarchio was in the province of Sassari, district of Nuoro, with the episcopal residence at Ozieri. The first bishop mentioned is Costantino Madrone (c. 1102), who was succeeded in 1116 by Bishop Pietro. The cathedral was built in 1153. The bishop's residence changed several times, to Giracle, and again to Ardera.

In 1503, at the death of Fra Calcerando, bishop of this see, Bisarchio was incorporated into the diocese of Alghero. The diocese was reestablished by Pope Pius VII in his Bull of 9 March 1803, and given to Giannantioco Azzei, in 1819 archbishop of Oristano, his native place.
 
The episcopal residence was then definitely transferred to Ozieri.
The change of name took place in 1915.

Ordinaries

Diocese of Bisarchio o Bisarcio (Ozieri)
Erected: 9 March 1804
Latin Name: Bisarchiensis

Giovanni Antioco Azzei  (24 Sep 1804 – 29 Mar 1819 Confirmed, Archbishop of Oristano)
Domenico Pes, Sch. P.  (29 Mar 1819 – 8 Dec 1831 Died)
Serafino Carchero, O.F.M. Cap.  (20 Jan 1834 – 31 Mar 1847 Died)
Serafino Corrias  (24 Nov 1871 – 31 May 1896 Died)
Filippo Bacciu  (30 Nov 1896 – 13 Mar 1914 Died)
Pietro Benedetti (15 December 1914, did not fill the post)

Diocese of Ozieri
Name Changed: 12 February 1915

Carmine Cesarano, C.SS.R.  (8 Apr 1915 – 30 Sep 1918 Appointed, Archbishop of Conza e Campagna)
Francesco Maria Franco  (10 Mar 1919 – 18 Sep 1933 Appointed, Bishop of Crema)
Igino Maria Serci Vaquer  (2 Feb 1934 – 30 May 1938 Died)
Francesco Cogoni  (3 Mar 1939 – 25 Apr 1975 Retired)
Giovanni Pisanu  (4 Mar 1978 – 27 Mar 1997 Retired)
Sebastiano Sanguinetti (27 Mar 1997 – 22 Apr 2006 Appointed, Bishop of Tempio-Ampurias)
Sergio Pintor (29 Sep 2006 – 10 Dec 2012 Retired)
Corrado Melis (18 Jul 2015 – )

Notes

External links and Sources 
GCatholic

Ozieri
Religious organizations established in 1804
Ozieri
1804 establishments in Italy